Maple Valley Township is a civil township of Montcalm County in the U.S. state of Michigan. The population was 2,083 at the 2000 census.

Communities
Colwell was an unincorporated community centered on a station of the Detroit, Lansing and Northern Raiilroad.  It had a post office from 1879 until 1882.
Coral began as a lumber camp organized by Rev. Charles Parker, who purchased land in sections 7 and 9 in 1861. A sawmill built by Morris and Henry Stump was key to its growth, and for a while the place was known as "Stumptown". Parker recorded a plat in 1862 and named it "Coral", reportedly "because it was easy to spell." It was a station on the Detroit, Lansing and Northern Railroad and John Holcomb became the first postmaster on March 22, 1869. The Coral post office, with ZIP code 49322, serves most of northern Maple Valley Township, as well as portions of Pine Township to the east and Winfield Township to the north.
 Trufant is an unincorporated community in the southeast part of the township. The post office, with ZIP code 49347, serves the southern part of Maple Valley Township, as well as portions of Pine Township to the east and a small area in Spencer Township to the south. Emery Trufant built the first water-powered sawmill here in 1872. He sold out to J. B. Hileman and Jacob Hesser, who later built a steam-powered mill on the site. Their firm platted the village of Trufant on March 10, 1875, and named it after Trufant, recognizing him as the first settler. 
 The village of Sand Lake is to the southwest in Kent County and the Sand Lake post office, with ZIP code 49343, also serves a small area in southwest Maple Valley Township.
 The village of Pierson is to the west in Pierson Township, and the Pierson post office, with ZIP code 49339, also serves a portion of western Maple Valley Township.
 The city of Howard City is to the northwest, and the Howard City post office, with ZIP code 49329, also serves a portion of northwest Maple Valley Township.

Geography
According to the United States Census Bureau, the township has a total area of 36.1 square miles (93.6 km2), of which 35.4 square miles (91.7 km2) is land and 0.7 square mile (1.9 km2) (1.99%) is water.

Demographics
As of the census of 2000, there were 2,083 people, 755 households, and 567 families residing in the township. There were 910 housing units at an average density of 25.7 per square mile (9.9/km2). The racial makeup of the township was 97.70% White, 0.19% African American, 0.14% Native American, 0.29% Asian, 0.10% Pacific Islander, 0.29% from other races, and 1.30% from two or more races. Hispanic or Latino of any race were 0.82% of the population.

There were 755 households, out of which 34.8% had children under the age of 18 living with them, 61.7% were married couples living together, 7.9% had a female householder with no husband present, and 24.8% were non-families. 20.7% of all households were made up of individuals, and 9.4% had someone living alone who was 65 years of age or older.  The average household size was 2.75 and the average family size was 3.20.

In the township the population was spread out, with 29.0% under the age of 18, 8.5% from 18 to 24, 27.1% from 25 to 44, 22.9% from 45 to 64, and 12.6% who were 65 years of age or older.  The median age was 35 years. For every 100 females, there were 102.4 males.  For every 100 females age 18 and over, there were 104.8 males.

The median income for a household in the township was $36,583, and the median income for a family was $40,433. Males had a median income of $32,738 versus $24,236 for females. The per capita income for the township was $15,163.  About 5.1% of families and 7.8% of the population were below the poverty line, including 6.3% of those under age 18 and 9.2% of those age 65 or over.

References

Townships in Montcalm County, Michigan
Townships in Michigan